Hero Cruz is a fictional character in comic books published by DC Comics. Within the narrative of the fictional DC Universe, Hero is a portrayal of a Latino gay superhero of African descent. He first appeared in Superboy and the Ravers (September 1996) and was created by Karl Kesel and Steve Mattsson.

According to Richard T. Rodríguez in Graphic Borders, Hero is an updated take on the concept of a gay superhero: "Unlike the earlier, effeminate characterization of Extraño nine years before, Hero Cruz was fashioned as a character who was unmistakably masculine and who didn't wear his homosexuality on his sleeve".

Fictional character biography 
Hero (his actual name, which is Greek) first appeared as a member the superhero team The Ravers founded by Superboy. He was a frequent regular of the Event Horizon, an intergalactic rave that featured hipsters and partiers from all over the galaxy. Though at first it was unclear what, if any, powers he possessed, it became apparent that his vest (later revealed to be the "Achilles Vest") emitted a force field that protected him from most forms of physical assault. He was somehow able to steal this from the lair of the Scavenger, a villainous packrat who stockpiles various items and gadgets from the DC Comics universe.

Hero eventually lost his vest, but found the even more interesting "H-Dial" (of Dial H for Hero fame), and soon realized that by spelling H-E-R-O on its dial, he would be granted the powers of and persona of one of several superheroes, supposedly merging with them using hypertime.

Since acquiring this device, Hero has taken on the roles of heroes like BadAxe (an axe-wielding warrior), and Human Justice (a powerful, deity-like figure). Later in the series, he would become the muscular Titanic in order to impress his female teammate  Sparx. While at first it seemed like the beginning of a relationship, Hero became more and more distant from her, eventually avoiding her altogether. It wasn't until they took a trip to Sparx's family ranch in Canada that he finally admitted that he was gay.

For a time, Hero is the companion of the long-lived sentient canine Rex the Wonder Dog, whom he implies had been found in some sort of metal container.

Near the end of the Ravers series, Sparx began to lose her powers, and in frustration told Hero that she not only didn't want to be his friend any more, but what he was doing was "not natural" and "wrong". Hero has since been in a relationship with the alien Leander and has decided to keep tabs on everyone else in "The Rave".

Hero was also an associate of Titans L.A. in The Titans.

Powers and abilities
The H-Dial (Hero Dial) gives Hero the ability to turn into any of a number of superheroes. The extent of this power is unknown, yet it appears to utilize hypertime. Among the hero forms he has used are:
 Badaxe
 Human Justice
 Stormfront
 Titanic
 Feathered Serpent
 Hot Head
 Death's Head Moth
 Ferronaut
 Captain Elastic
 Diamond Lord
 Isis
 Radio Ranger
 Faust
 Caduceus the Healer
 Viridian Paladin
 Port

References

African-American superheroes
Fictional Afro–Latin American people
Comics characters introduced in 1996
DC Comics LGBT superheroes
Fictional gay males
Characters created by Karl Kesel